1893–94 in Scottish football was the 21st season of competitive football in Scotland and the fourth season of Scottish league football. For the first time there were two divisions in the Scottish Football League, there was no automatic promotion and relegation but the bottom three clubs in Division One and the top three clubs in Division Two were subject to a vote of the remaining First Division clubs. This season also saw the introduction of the Highland Football League.

League competitions

Scottish Division One 

Celtic became Scottish Division One champions for the second year in a row, after defeating Rangers 3–2 at Celtic Park on 24 February 1894. Renton were relegated, Dundee and Leith Athletic re-elected to Division One.

Scottish Division Two 

Clyde were elected to Division One, Hibernian and Cowlairs remained in the Scottish Division Two. 
Port Glasgow Athletic were docked seven points for fielding an ineligible player.

Other honours

Cup honours

National

County

Non-league honours

Senior 
Highland League

Other Leagues

Scotland national team

Scotland were winners of the British Home Championship in 1894 after pipping England to the trophy.

Key:
 (H) = Home match
 (A) = Away match
 BHC = British Home Championship

Other national teams

Scottish League XI

See also
 1893–94 Rangers F.C. season

Notes

References

External links
Scottish Football Historical Archive

 
Seasons in Scottish football